"There's a Whole Lot of Loving" is a song written by Christian Arnold with lyrics by David Martin and Geoff Morrow, released under the name of Guys 'n' Dolls. The song was a number-two hit in both the United Kingdom and Ireland and became the biggest hit for the group. The song was also an adult contemporary hit in North America, peaking at number 15 on the US Billboard Easy Listening chart and number 17 on Canada's RPM Pop Music Playlist. Elsewhere, the song reached the top 20 in Belgium, the Netherlands, and South Africa.

Background
The song was originally recorded in 1974 by a group of session singers (including Tony Burrows and Clare Torry) for a TV advertisement for McVitie's biscuits. Guys 'n' Dolls were formed to cash in upon the popularity of the jingle and to present it as a single. However, the group was not ready in time to record an entirely new version for the single's hasty release, so the voices of the session singers remained on the single.

Track listing
7-inch single
A. "There's a Whole Lot of Loving" – 3:00
B. "Don't Turn the Other Cheek" – 3:05

Personnel
Personnel are lifted from the 7-inch single vinyl disc.
 Chris Arnold – writing, production
 David Martin – writing, production
 Geoff Morrow – writing, production
 Andrew Jackman – arrangement

Charts

Weekly charts

Year-end charts

Certifications

Six version

The song was covered in 2002 by Irish pop band Six and was a number-one single in Ireland, where it was titled "There's a Whole Lot of Loving Going On". It became Ireland's best-selling song of 2002 and went on to become the country's third best-selling single of all time. Six's version was also a top-10 hit in Norway and New Zealand; in these countries, the song retained its original name.

Track listings
CD single
 "There's a Whole Lot of Loving Going On" – 3:06
 "United We Stand" – 3:36
 Interview with the band – 8:23

Cassette single
 "There's a Whole Lot of Loving Going On" – 3:06
 "United We Stand" – 3:36

Credits and personnel
Credits are lifted from the CD single liner notes.

Studios
 Recorded at PWL Studios (London, England)
 Mastered at 360 Mastering (London, England)

Personnel

 Quizlarossi – production
 Pete Waterman – production
 Bernard Löhr – mix engineering
 Mark "Ridders" Risdale – engineering
 Roe Waterman – assistant engineering
 Dick Beetham – mastering
 Image Now (Dublin, Ireland) – art direction and design
 Barry McCall – photography

Charts

Weekly charts

Year-end charts

All-time charts

Certifications

References

1975 debut singles
1975 songs
2002 debut singles
Bertelsmann Music Group singles
Irish Singles Chart number-one singles
Magnet Records singles
Song recordings produced by Quiz & Larossi
Songs written by Geoff Morrow
Guys 'n' Dolls songs